Caccoplectus is a genus of ant-loving beetles in the family Staphylinidae. There are about nine described species in Caccoplectus.

Species
These nine species belong to the genus Caccoplectus:
 Caccoplectus conicus Chandler & Wolda, 1986
 Caccoplectus degallieri Chandler & Wolda, 1986
 Caccoplectus lucidus Chandler & Wolda, 1986
 Caccoplectus nuttingi Chandler, 1976
 Caccoplectus pectinatus Chandler, 1976
 Caccoplectus schwarzi Chandler & Wolda
 Caccoplectus sentis Chandler, 1976
 Caccoplectus spinipes Schaeffer, 1906 (spine-legged pselaphid)
 Caccoplectus sucineas

References

Further reading

 
 

Pselaphitae
Articles created by Qbugbot